Sankarabharanam is a 1980 Indian Telugu-language musical drama film written and directed by K. Viswanath. Produced by Edida Nageswara Rao under the production company Poornodaya Movie Creations, Sankarabharanam starred J. V. Somayajulu, Manju Bhargavi, Chandra Mohan, and Rajyalakshmi. The soundtrack was composed by K. V. Mahadevan and remained a chartbuster. The film throws light on the chasm between Classical and Western Music based on the perspective of people from two different generations.

Sankarabharanam won the Prize of the Public at the "Besançon Film Festival of France" in the year 1981. It was screened at the 8th International Film Festival of India, the Tashkent Film Festival, the Asia Pacific Film Festival, the Moscow International Film Festival held in May 1980, and the AISFM Film Festival. Forbes included J. V. Somayajulu's performance in the film on its list of "25 Greatest Acting Performances of Indian Cinema". In 2013, in an online poll conducted by CNN-IBN on their website as part of the hundred years celebration of Indian cinema, Sankarabharanam came eleventh in the poll for finding the "greatest Indian film ever."

Sankarabharanam opened to near-empty halls and by the end of the first week, all theaters were houseful for every show. It had an extraordinary run, running for more than 25 weeks in many centers. Released in Bangalore without dubbing it ran for a year. It won four National Film Awards including the Best Film with Mass Appeal, Wholesome Entertainment & Aesthetic Values, the first for a South-Indian film at the 27th National Film Awards, and seven state Nandi Awards. It was later dubbed into Tamil and Malayalam under the same title. The Malayalam dub went on to run for over an year in theatres. Viswanath subsequently directed the Hindi remake Sur Sangam.

Plot
Sankara Sastri, a widower with a daughter named Sarada, is one of the most popular Carnatic singers of the day, famed for having mastered the raga Sankarabharanam. Tulasi is the daughter of a devadasi, who admires Sastri from afar. Once, when Sastri came to their town on tour, Tulasi met him on the riverbank when Sastri was teaching his own daughter.

One morning Tulasi was so thrilled by Sastri's singing that she begins dancing on the riverbank, oblivious of her surroundings. Sastri sees her, and Tulasi also comes to her senses and abruptly stops. She expects Sastri to rebuke her. But he appreciates her sincerity and continues singing.

Tulasi's mother wants her to follow in the family tradition of becoming a courtesan, believes she can extract a high price for Tulasi from a rich man. Once the deal was struck, the man raped Tulasi. Seeing a photo of Sastri in Tulasi's room, he breaks it and taunts her by saying that she is now free to be the old Sastri's mistress. The enraged Tulasi stabs her rapist with a shard of glass from the broken frame of Sastri's photo, killing him.

At the subsequent murder trial Sastri engages a close friend, a lawyer, to defend Tulasi. Tulasi's mother is sent to jail for engaging in prostitution, while Tulasi goes free but finds herself homeless. When Sastri takes Tulasi to his own house, the rumour spreads that Tulasi has become Sastri's mistress. Engaged to sing at a temple, everyone, including Sastri's musical accompanists, leaves on seeing Tulasi. Feeling responsible for this public insult to the man she reveres, Tulasi leaves Sastri's home.

Over time, while pop music is on the ascendant, the popularity of classical music wanes, Sastri loses his audience and, with them his comfortable lifestyle. Ten years later, Sastri is living in a small house with his daughter, who has grown into adulthood. Meanwhile, Tulasi has inherited her mother's property after her mother's demise.

Tulasi has a ten-year-old son, the result of her rape, and desires that he become Sastri's student. Tulasi gets her son to pretend to be homeless, entering Sastri's household as a servant. Tulasi is content to watch from a distance as her son gradually becomes Sastri's musical protege.

Pamulaparti Venkata Kameswara Rao, a schoolteacher by profession but a dilettante singer at heart, falls in love with Sarada. Although Sastri rejects the alliance at first, he agrees after hearing the man sing at the village temple.

Tulasi arranges for a concert on the day of Sarada's wedding, in a new auditorium which she named for her mentor. Sastri sings at the concert but suffers a heart attack part-way through it. His disciple, Tulasi's son, takes over from the sidelines and continues singing the song.

As Sastri watches his student with pride, he also sees Tulasi at the side of the hall and realizes that the boy is Tulasi's son. A doctor is brought to attend to Sastri, but Sastri waves him off, knowing that his end is near. As Tulasi's son completes the song, Sastri symbolically anoints the boy as his musical heir by giving his "aabharanam" (his leg bracelet) to him and dies. Tulasi comes running to her guru, and dies at his feet. The film ends on this tragic but uplifting note, as Sastri's newly-wed daughter and son-in-law take charge of Tulasi's son.

Cast

 J. V. Somayajulu as 'Sankarabharanam' Sankara Sastry
 Manju Bhargavi as Tulasi
 Chandra Mohan as Kameswara Rao
 Rajyalakshmi Chendu as Sarada
 Tulasi as Sankaram
 Allu Ramalingaiah as Madhava
 Nirmalamma as Bamma
 Sakshi Ranga Rao as Gopalam
 Dubbing Janaki as cook
 Jith Mohan Mitra as Dasu
 Baby Varalakshmi as Young Sarada
 Jhansi as Ratna Papa
 Pushpa Kumari
 Arja Janardhana Rao as Tulasi's maternal uncle
 Edida Sriramprasad
 S. Bheemeswara Rao as Zamindar
 Dhum
 Srigopal
 Ganeswara Rao

Production

Development
After hearing the plot, the producers were initially taken aback due to the parallel cinema tone to the subject matter, but finally Edida Nageswara Rao agreed to produce the film. He wanted Akkineni Nageswara Rao to enact the role of Sankara Sastry, K. Viswanath wanted Sivaji Ganesan to perform the role, but couldn't approach him for various reasons and also wanted Krishnam Raju for the role, but later refused as Viswanath felt his image as a star would ruin the role and he chose a debutant J. V. Somayajulu, a stage artist for the role. K. Viswanath scripted and directed the film, while Jandhyala gave the dialogues. Balu Mahendra performed the cinematography while the film is edited by G. G. Krishna Rao. Thota Tharani worked as the film's production designer. Vamsy, who went on to direct films like Sitaara, Anveshana and Ladies Tailor was one of the assistant directors in the film.

Filming 
The film was primarily shot in and around the city of Rajahmundry in Andhra Pradesh.

Soundtrack
The music, largely Carnatic based, was composed by K.V. Mahadevan. M. Balamuralikrishna was the original choice for the male playback singer, due to the heavy classical content of the compositions. Since M. Balamuralikrishna was not so much inclined to sing in the movie, K. V. Mahadevan, having faith in the mettle of S. P. Balasubrahmanyam, insisted on him taking up this challenge. The soundtrack has lyrics by Veturi and vocals by S. P. Balasubrahmanyam, S. Janaki, Vani Jayaram, S.P. Sailaja, Madhavapeddi Ramesh, Jit Mohan Mitra, and Pattabhi.

Release and reception
Released on 2 February 1980, the film was released in only a very few theatres and opened to almost empty halls. However, in a week through positive reviews and word of mouth theatres were packed. The film had 216-day run at Royal theatre, Hyderabad. The film was dubbed into Malayalam and released in New Theatre, Thiruvananthapuram and Kavitha Theatre, Ernakulam on 12 September 1980, where it ran successfully for over 200 days. It is considered a cult classic in Telugu cinema especially due to the use of carnatic music that is more true to the classical form than for film.

Accolades

International recognition 
 The film won the Prize of the Public at the "Besançon Film Festival of France" in the year 1981.
 On the centenary of Indian cinema in 2013, Forbes included J. V. Somayajulu's performance in the film on its list of "25 Greatest Acting Performances of Indian Cinema".
 In 2013, in an online poll conducted by CNN-IBN on their website as part of the hundred years celebration of Indian cinema, Sankarabharanam came eleventh in the poll for finding the "greatest Indian film ever."

National recognition 
The film won four National Film Awards, primarily in the Music categories. This makes Sankarabharanam the only Telugu film to win four National Film Awards at the time. The film is one of the three Telugu films to win the National Film Award for Best Popular Film Providing Wholesome Entertainment. The film also won seven Nandi Awards, including the Nandi Award for Best Feature Film. Four of the seven Nandi Awards are from the Music categories.

Legacy
The success of this film triggered a sequence of classical films in Telugu, including Tyagayya (by Bapu), Meghasandesam (by Dasari N. Rao), and Viswanath's own follow-ups: Saptapadi, Saagara Sangamam, Sruthi Layalu, Swarna Kamalam, Swayam Krushi, Sirivennela, and Swati Kiranam. S.P. Balasubrahmanyam, the Telugu playback singer who rendered all the songs of Sastri's character, has often said this movie was the highlight of his career. It got 'SPB' his first National Award, and made him a household name across all of South India. Film critic Gudipoodi Srihari called it the best Telugu film he has seen after Mayabazar.

References

Bibliography

External links

1980s Telugu-language films
Films directed by K. Viswanath
Social realism in film
Films about teacher–student relationships
1980s musical drama films
Films about the arts
Films about classical music and musicians
Films scored by K. V. Mahadevan
Best Popular Film Providing Wholesome Entertainment National Film Award winners
Indian nonlinear narrative films
Telugu films remade in other languages
Films about social issues in India
Indian musical drama films
Indian avant-garde and experimental films
1980 drama films
1980 films